WVMM is Messiah University's student-operated radio station, located at 90.7 MHz FM.  The station is known by its listeners as "The Pulse".  Messiah College had a radio station from 1970–1983. On October 6, 1989, WVMM was resumed, this time as an over-the-air FM radio station. Prior to that, it was heard only on campus.  WVMM now operates at 100 watts, and can be heard throughout the Harrisburg area.

Programming 
WVMM maintains an eclectic mix of programming, ranging from the primary format of indie/college rock to bluegrass, Latin, hardcore, hip hop, jazz, world, and electronica.  The station also airs the BBC World Service weekdays from 7a.m. to 11a.m., as well as sports/entertainment programming from the BBC at certain weekend times, and other current events/issues programming during the week.

External links
 
 
 

VMM
VMM
Messiah University
Radio stations established in 1989
1989 establishments in Pennsylvania